Noctuoidea is the superfamily of noctuid  (Latin "night owl") or "owlet" moths, and has more than 70,000 described species, the largest number of for any Lepidopteran superfamily. Its classification has not yet reached a satisfactory or stable state. Since the end of the 20th century, increasing availability of molecular phylogenetic data for this hugely successful radiation has led to several competing proposals for a taxonomic arrangement that correctly represents the relationships between the major lineages.

Briefly, the disputes center on the fact that in old treatments (which were just as unable to reach a general consensus) the distinctness of some groups, such as the Arctiidae or Lymantriidae, was overrated due to their characteristic appearance, while some less-studied lineages conventionally held to be Noctuidae are in fact quite distinct. This requires a rearrangement at least of the latter family (by simply including anything disputed within it). This is quite unwieldy, and various more refined treatments have been proposed in response to it. While there is general agreement on what the basal families of Noctuoidea are, the more diverse advanced group may be treated as one all-encompassing Noctuidae, two huge and two smaller, or even (if Arctiidae or Lymantriidae are kept distinct) more than four families, which are in some cases still quite sizeable.

Recent developments
There are several recent studies suggesting a radical change in the traditional family level classification. Recent works in redefining the families within the Noctuoidea has been carried out by Kitching (1984), Poole (1995), Kitching and Rawlins [1998], Speidel et al. (1996), Mitchell et al. (1997, 2000, 2006), Fibiger and Lafontaine (2005), Lafontaine and Fibiger (2006) and Zahiri et al. (2010).

The Noctuoidea can be divided into two broad groups, those with a trifid forewing venation (Oenosandridae, Notodontidae and Doidae), and those with a quadrifid forewing venation (e.g., Arctiidae, Lymantriidae, Nolidae, Noctuidae). What has emerged from these investigations is that the quadrifid Noctuoidea form a monophyletic group. In 2005, Fibiger and Lafontaine arranged the quadrifid (forewing) group into several families, including the quadrifine (hindwing) Erebidae and trifine (hindwing) Noctuidae, based on evidence that suggested that the trifine noctuid subfamilies were derived from within the quadrifine subfamilies, so the family Erebidae would not be strictly monophyletic.

Lafontaine and Fibiger in 2006 then redefined the Noctuidae to include the entire quadrifid group, believing the Arctiidae, Lymantriidae, and Nolidae to be derived from within this expanded concept of Noctuidae (and closely related to the subfamily Catocalinae). In essence, groups such as the Arctiidae, which had previously been treated as a separate family, were more closely related to groups within the Noctuidae than to non-noctuid families. In order to address this, a revised classification would have meant either recognizing over 20 (often weakly defined) families, or a single well-defined family with numerous subfamilies. The latter was adopted (Lafontaine and Fibiger 2006).

More recent evidence from nuclear genes (Zahiri et al. 2010) confirms that the quadrifid (forewing) noctuoids form a monophyletic group, but also that this group can be further arranged into four monophyletic subgroups: 1) the quadrifine subfamilies; 2) the trifine subfamilies; 3) the Nolinae; and 4) the Euteliinae. Considering the massive size of the family, and the large number of subfamilies, tribes, and subtribes to arrange into a classification, Zahiri et al. (2010) chose the option of recognizing these four groups as families, namely Erebidae, Noctuidae, Nolidae, and Euteliidae, in addition to the basal trifid families.

Systematics

This follows Lafontaine & Fibiger (2006), with the additions of Thiacidinae Hacker & Zilli, 2007 and taxa in Micronoctuidae Fibiger, 2005. Note that the placement of Arctiidae, Lymantriidae and Nolidae as subfamilies of Noctuidae has been largely rejected by subsequent authors. An updated classification for North American Noctuoidea has recently been published (Lafontaine & Schmidt, 2010) and further changes are imminent for a global molecular review of the superfamily (Zahiri et al., in press).

 Family Oenosandridae Miller, 1991
 Family Doidae Donahue & Brown, 1987
 Family Notodontidae Stephens, 1829
 Subfamily Thaumetopoeinae Aurivillius, 1889
 Subfamily Pygaerinae Duponchel, 1845
 Subfamily Platychasmatinae Nakamura, 1956
 Subfamily Notodontinae Stephens, 1829
 Tribe Notodontini Stephens, 1829
 Tribe Dicranurini Duponchel, 1845
 Subfamily Phalerinae Butler, 1886
 Subfamily Dudusinae Matsumura, 1925
 Tribe Dudusini Matsumura, 1925
 Tribe Scranciini Miller, 1991
 Subfamily Hemiceratinae Guenée, 1852
 Subfamily Heterocampinae Neumogen & Dyar, 1894
 Subfamily Nystaleinae Forbes, 1948
 Subfamily Dioptinae Walker, 1862
 Family Micronoctuidae Fibiger, 2005
 Subfamily Micronoctuinae Fibiger, 2005
 Subfamily Pollexinae Fibiger, 2007
 Subfamily Belluliinae Fibiger, 2008
 Tribe Belluliini Fibiger, 2008
 Tribe Medialini Fibiger, 2008
 Subfamily Magninae Fibiger, 2008
 Tribe Magnini Fibiger, 2008
 Tribe Faeculini Fibiger, 2008
 Subfamily Parachrostiinae Fibiger, 2008
 Tribe Duplexini Fibiger, 2008
 Tribe Parachrostiini Fibiger, 2008
 Family Noctuidae Latreille, 1809
 Subfamily Rivulinae Grote, 1895
 Subfamily Boletobiinae Grote, 1895
 Subfamily Hypenodinae Forbes, 1954
 Subfamily Araeopteroninae Fibiger, 2005
 Subfamily Eublemminae Forbes, 1954
 Tribe Eublemmini Forbes, 1954
 Tribe Pangraptini Grote, 1882
 Subfamily Herminiinae Leach, 1815
 Subfamily Scolecocampinae Grote, 1883
 Subfamily Hypeninae Herrich-Schäffer, 1851
 Subfamily Phytometrinae Hampson, 1913
 Subfamily Aventiinae Tutt, 1896
 Subfamily Erebinae Leach, 1815
 Subfamily Calpinae Boisduval, 1840
 Tribe Anomini Grote, 1882
 Tribe Calpini Boisduval, 1840
 Tribe Phyllodini Guenée, 1852
 Subfamily Catocalinae Boisduval, 1828
 Tribe Toxocampini Guenée, 1852
 Tribe Acantholipini Fibiger & Lafontaine, 2005
 Tribe Arytrurini Fibiger & Lafontaine, 2005
 Tribe Melipotini Grote, 1895
 Tribe Euclidiini Guenée, 1852
 Tribe Panopodini Forbes, 1954
 Tribe Ophiusini Guenée, 1837 (= Omopterini Boisduval, 1833, suppressed older syn.)
 Tribe Catocalini Boisduval, 1828
 Tribe Anobini Holloway, 2005 (= Anobini Wiltshire, 1990, nomen nudum) 
 Tribe Sypnini Holloway, 2005
 Tribe Hypopyrini Guenée, 1852
 Tribe Tinolini Moore, 1885
 Tribe Hulodini Guenée, 1852 (= Speiredoniinae Swinhoe, 1900)
 Tribe Ommatophorini Guenée, 1852
 Tribe Pericymini Wiltshire; 1976
 Tribe Pandesmini Wiltshire, 1990, nomen nudum
 Tribe Catephiini Guenée, 1852
 Tribe Ercheini Berio, 1992
 Subfamily Cocytiinae Boisduval, 1874
 Subfamily Stictopterinae Hampson, 1894
 Subfamily Euteliinae Grote, 1882
 (Subfamily Nolinae) Bruand, 1846, stat rev.
 Tribe Nolini Bruand, 1846, stat rev. 
 Tribe Chloephorini Stainton, 1859, stat rev.
 Subtribe Chloephorina Stainton, 1859, stat rev.
 Subtribe Sarrothripina Hampson, 1894, stat rev.
 Subtribe Camptolomina Mell, 1943, stat rev.
 Subtribe Careina Moore, 1883, stat rev. 
 Subtribe Ariolicina Mell, 1943, stat rev. 
 Tribe Westermanniini Hampson, 1918, stat rev. 
 Tribe Eariadini Hampson, 1912, stat rev. 
 Tribe Blenini Mell, 1943, stat rev. 
 Tribe Risobini Mell, 1943, stat rev. 
 Tribe Collomenini Kitching & Rawlins, 1998, stat rev. 
 Tribe Afridini Kitching & Rawlins, 1998, stat rev. 
 Tribe Eligmini Mell, 1943, stat rev.
 Subfamily Aganainae Boisduval, 1833
 (Subfamily Arctiinae Leach, 1815), stat. nov. 
 Tribe Lithosiini Billberg, 1820, stat. rev. 
 Subtribe Phryganopterygina Bendib & Minet, 1999, stat. rev. 
 Subtribe Aesalina Bendib & Minet, 1999, stat. rev. 
 Subtribe Eudesmiina Bendib & Minet, 1999, stat. rev. 
 Subtribe Cisthenina Bendib & Minet, 1999, stat. rev. 
 Subtribe Nudariina Börner, 1920, stat. rev. 
 Subtribe Endrosina Börner, 1932, stat. rev. 
 Subtribe Lithosiina Billberg, 1820, stat. rev. 
 Tribe Syntomini Herrich-Schäffer, 1846, stat. rev. 
 Subtribe Syntomina Herrich-Schäffer, 1846, stat. rev. 
 Subtribe Thyretina Butler, 1876, stat. rev.
 Tribe Arctiini Leach, 1815, stat. rev. 
 Subtribe Arctiina Leach, 1815, stat. rev. 
 Subtribe Callimorphina Walker, 1865, stat. rev. 
 Subtribe Pericopina Walker, 1865, stat. rev. 
 Subtribe Phaegopterina Kirby, 1892, stat. rev. 
 Subtribe Ctenuchina Kirby, 1837, stat. rev. 
 Subtribe Euchromiina Butler, 1876, stat. rev.
 (Subfamily Lymantriinae) Hampson, 1893, stat. nov. 
 Tribe Lymantriini Hampson, 1893, stat. rev. 
 Tribe Orgyiini Wallengren, 1861, stat. rev. 
 Tribe Arctornithini Holloway, 1999, stat. rev. 
 Tribe Leucomini Grote, 1895, stat. rev. 
 Tribe Nygmiini Holloway, 1999, stat. rev.
 Subfamily Strepsimaninae Meyrick, 1930, stat rev.
 Subfamily Plusiinae Boisduval, 1828
 Tribe Abrostolini Eichlin & Cunningham, 1978
 Tribe Argyrogrammatini Eichlin & Cunningham, 1978
 Tribe Plusiini Boisduval, 1828
 Subtribe Autoplusiina Kitching, 1987
 Subtribe Euchaciina Chou & Lu, 1979
 Subtribe Plusiina Boisduval, 1828
 Subfamily Eustrotiinae Grote, 1882
 Subfamily Bagisarinae Crumb, 1956
 Tribe Bagisarini Crumb, 1956
 Tribe Cydosiini Kitching & Rawlins, 1998
 Subfamily Acontiinae Guenée, 1841
 Tribe Hypercalymniini Fibiger & Lafontaine, 2005
 Tribe Acontiini Guenée, 1841
 Tribe Armadini Wiltshire, 1961
 Tribe Aediini Beck, 1960
 Subfamily Pantheinae Smith, 1898
 Subfamily Diphtherinae Fibiger & Lafontaine, 2005
 Subfamily Dilobinae Aurivillius, 1889
 Subfamily Raphiinae Beck, 1996
 Subfamily Balsinae Grote, 1896, stat. rev.
 Subfamily Acronictinae Heinemann, 1859
 Subfamily Metoponiinae Herrich-Schäffer, 1851
 Subfamily Sinocharinae Speidel, Fänger & Naumann, 1996
 Subfamily Lophonyctinae Speidel, Fänger & Naumann, 1996
 Subfamily Agaristinae Herrich-Schäffer, 1858
 Subfamily Eucocytiinae Hampson, 1918
 Subfamily Cuculliinae Herrich-Schäffer, 1850
 Subfamily Oncocnemidinae Forbes & Franclemont, 1954
 Subfamily Amphipyrinae Guenée, 1837
 Subfamily Psaphidinae Grote, 1896
 Tribe Psaphidini Grote, 1896
 Tribe Feraliini Poole, 1995
 Tribe Nocloini Poole, 1995
 Tribe Triocnemidini Poole, 1995
 Subfamily Stiriinae Grote, 1882
 Tribe Stiriini Grote, 1882
 Tribe Grotellini Poole, 1995
 Tribe Azenini Poole, 1995
 Subfamily Heliothinae Boisduval, 1828
 Subfamily Condicinae Poole, 1995
 Tribe Condicini Poole, 1995
 Tribe Leuconyctini Poole, 1995
 Subfamily Eriopinae Herrich-Schäffer, 1851
 Subfamily Bryophilinae Guenée, 1852
 Subfamily Xyleninae Guenée, 1837
 Tribe Pseudeustrotiini Beck, 1996
 Tribe Phosphilini Poole, 1995, stat. rev.
 Tribe Prodenilni Forbes, 1954
 Tribe Eiaphriini Beck, 1996
 Tribe Caradrinini Boisduval, 1840
 Subtribe Caradrinina Boisduval, 1840
 Subtribe Athetina Fibiger & Lafontaine, 2005
 Tribe Dypterygiini Forbes, 1954
 Tribe Actinotiini Beck, 1996
 Tribe Phlogophorini Hampson, 1918
 Tribe Apameini Guenée, 1841 (= Nonagriini Guenée, 1837, suppressed older syn.)
 Subtribe Oxytripiina Gozmany, 1970
 Subtribe Apameina Guenée, 1841
 Subtribe Sesamiina Fibiger & Goldstein, 2005
 Tribe Arzamini Grote, 1883
 Tribe Episemini Guenée, 1852
 Tribe Xylenini Guenée, 1837
 Subtribe Xylenina Guenée, 1837
 Subtribe Cosmiina Guenée, 1852, stat. rev.
 Subtribe Antitypina Forbes & Franclemont, 1954
 Subtribe Ufeina Crumb, 1956
 Subfamily Hadeninae Guenée, 1837
 Tribe Orthosiini Guenée, 1837
 Tribe Tholerini Beck, 1996
 Tribe Hadenini Guenée, 1837
 Tribe Leucaniini Guenée, 1837
 Tribe Eriopygini Fibiger & Lafontaine, 2005
 Tribe Glottulini Guenée, 1852
 Subfamily Noctuinae Latreille, 1809
 Tribe Agrotini Rambur, 1848
 Subtribe Austrandesiina Angulo & Olivares, 1990
 Subtribe Agrotina Rambur, 1848
 Tribe Noctuini Latreille, 1809
 Subtribe Axyliina Fibiger & Lafontaine, 2005
 Subtribe Noctuina Latreille, 1809

References

Hacker, Hermann H. & Zilli, Alberto (2007). Esperiana Buchreihe zur Entomologie Memoir 3: 179–246.
Kitching, Ian J. & Rawlins, John E. (1999). "The Noctuoidea". In: Lepidoptera, Moths and Butterflies, Volume 1: Evolution, Systematics, and Biogeography, ed. N. P.Kristensen, pp. 355–401. Walter de Gruyter, Berlin.
Lafontaine, J. Donald & Fibiger, Michael (2006). "Revised higher classification of the Noctuoidea (Lepidoptera)". Canadian Entomologist. 138 (5): 610–635 

O'Toole, Christopher (ed.) (2002). Firefly Encyclopedia of Insects and Spiders. .

External links

Tree of Life
Noctuoidea (summary of R. Zahiri's ongoing PhD studies)

 
Lepidoptera superfamilies
Macroheterocera